Novotroitsk is a rural locality (a village) in Karmaskalinsky Selsoviet, Karmaskalinsky District, Bashkortostan, Russia. The population was 16 as of 2010. There is 1 street.

Geography 
Novotroitsk is located 10 km southeast of Karmaskaly (the district's administrative centre) by road. Ivanovka is the nearest rural locality.

References 

Rural localities in Karmaskalinsky District